Blue Dolphin was an auxiliary schooner built in 1926 at Shelburne, Nova Scotia by the Shelburne Shipbuilding Company as an adventure yacht. She served as US Navy auxiliary, IX 65 in World War II and as a postwar research vessel made famous by a Stan Rogers song.

Construction 

Blue Dolphin was designed by the famous naval architect William Roue, designer of the famous racing schooner Bluenose. Sometimes called a sister ship to Bluenose, Blue Dolphin was in fact considerably smaller but reflected the overall style of Bluenose. Blue Dolphin was built for Stephen Henry Velie, Jr of Kansas City. A rich businessman interested in "long foreign voyages," Felie ordered a fishing schooner style vessel with an extra reinforced hull but luxurious cabins in place of a fishing hold. She was registered at Shelburne for the beginning of her career which her owner used as a base for adventure trips to the north.

In 1933, Blue Dolphin was purchased by Boston businessman Amory Coolidge (1895–1952) who transferred her registry to Boston, Massachusetts in 1935.

US Navy service 

Blue Dolphin was acquired by the Navy on 17 March 1942 from Amory Coolidge for the nominal fee of $1.00. She was designated a miscellaneous auxiliary, IX 65 and placed in service at the Section Base, Boston on 6 April 1942.

Blue Dolphin spent the next 38 months serving as station vessel at Casco Bay, Maine. Shortly after Germany surrendered, she was placed out of service at Boston on 28 June 1945. Her name was struck from the Navy list on 11 July 1945, and she was delivered to the Maritime Commission's War Shipping Administration for disposal on 14 September 1945.

Research vessel 

After the war, Blue Dolphin was apparently sold to a Mr. David C. Nutt who was involved in oceanographic research in conjunction with various universities, civilian research organizations, and the Office of Naval Research. Mr. Nutt was also a naval reserve commander. On 3 April 1949, she was designated as "suitable for use as a naval auxiliary in time of war" by the Chief of Naval Operations. She was also authorized to fly the Naval Reserve Yacht pennant. The last information available on her indicates that she continued to conduct oceanographic and hydrobiological research out of Boothbay Harbor, Maine, into the summer of 1954.

Move to Sarnia 

While still in Maine, The Blue Dolphin changed hands again. A printer from Detroit named Joe Pica purchased her. Pica had already restored one vessel - the Katherine II - and was looking for a larger ship. He sailed the Blue Dolphin into the Great Lakes where she was berthed in Sarnia, Ontario, for a number of years. That was the last time the Blue Dolphin left the dock under her own power. She sank at the dock in Sarnia at least twice during the restoration efforts. The first time, Pica said the fresh water permeated her okum caulking and when freeze up came it turned to ice. With ice-out, so went the caulking opening up a seam one eighth inch wide by nearly one hundred feet long. With no ship keeper to stem the inflow, she sank. The second sinking Pica attributed to sabotage - unsubstantiated.

Restoration attempt and Stan Rogers song 

Journalist and photographer Bruce Kemp became interested in the restoration when he was assigned the story by Sailing Canada Magazine. Because of his affiliation with another magazine at the time, he wrote the final piece under the name of Howard Douglas Jr.  Kemp and his wife Donna worked with Pica in trying to set up a foundation, have debts forgiven and to make the ship an ambassador for the city of Sarnia. Kemp also worked on the project as the last in a string of divers and helped raise the ship the second time. He was instrumental in getting folk singer Stan Rogers to agree to aid the project.

Rogers commemorated the schooner with his song, "Man with Blue Dolphin", part of his From Fresh Water album. The liner notes mention that Rogers wrote the song based on his contact with Bruce Kemp and Kemp's experiences trying to raise and restore the Blue Dolphin. Unfortunately, a few weeks after writing the song "Man with Blue Dolphin" Rogers died in an airplane fire in Cincinnati.

Flight to Detroit 

When money problems began to plague the ship again, Pica hired a tug to tow the Blue Dolphin over the border into the United States and away from his creditors. He did this without telling any of the people trying to help him.

 She was last seen by Kemp in 2001. She was lying on her side and partly submerged.

On 19 September 2014 Tod Whitfield went to Detroit to have a last look at the Blue Dolphin. Tod had spent many years on the Blue Dolphin in the early seventies, while it was in Sarnia, Ontario. The ship is sitting on the bottom, up against the dock in the Goat Yard, in a state well past any thought of being salvageable.  On that same trip, Tod was also able to locate Joe Pica, who is living in his antiquated printing shop in downtown Detroit. Joe was 85 at the time but is still in good shape. He admitted that his memory is going but was quite happy to tell yet another old ship story.   An obituary shows that Joe Pica died on 14 July 2016.

On 9 October 2018, Jim Rasor photographed the sunken wreck of the Blue Dolphin in the canal beside the Goat Yard.  The water was crystal clear and the wreck is now fully submerged.  The GPS coordinates appear to be here.

On 20 April 2020, the Goat Yard Marine posted pictures of retrieving the doghouse from the water.

References

.

1926 ships
Ships built in Nova Scotia
Schooners of the United States Navy